The 1982 Stanley Cup playoffs, the playoff tournament of the National Hockey League (NHL) began on April 7, after the conclusion of the 1981–82 NHL season. The playoffs concluded on May 16 with the champion New York Islanders defeating the Vancouver Canucks 3–1 to win the final series four games to none and win the Stanley Cup. 

The first round of the 1982 playoffs saw three first-place teams (Edmonton, Minnesota, and Montreal) upset by fourth-place teams, a round which featured what is still the greatest comeback in NHL history:  The Kings' 6–5 win over Edmonton in game three.  After trailing 5–0 after two periods, the Kings scored five third period goals—three in the last 5:22, the final goal coming with only five seconds left in regulation.  Los Angeles then scored on a face-off early in overtime, thus completing the "Miracle on Manchester".

The eventual champion New York Islanders nearly capitulated in the first round as well, losing games three and four of their first-round playoff series with Pittsburgh after crushing the Penguins in the first two games.  In game five, the Islanders scored twice in the last five minutes to force overtime and then won the series on John Tonelli's goal 6:19 into the extra session.  This served as a wake-up call for New York, who lost only two more games the rest of the way on their march to a third straight Stanley Cup. Their Finals opponents, the Vancouver Canucks, finished the regular season with only 77 points, defeating three teams beneath them in the standings (Calgary 75, Los Angeles 63, and Chicago 72) in the much weaker Campbell Conference.

Playoff seeds
The 1982 playoffs introduced a new format, in which the four teams with the best regular-season records from each of the four divisions secured playoff berths. The best-of-five division semi-finals saw the first-place club against the fourth-place team, while the other two teams played each other. The winning clubs would then meet in a best-of-seven division final. Home-ice advantage for these first two rounds of the playoffs were granted to the team with the better regular-season record. Division winners then faced one another in the conference finals. The two Conference Champions played for the Stanley Cup. With the exception of extending the first round to a best-of-seven in 1987, this format remained in place through the 1993 playoffs.

Home-ice advantage for the conference finals was determined by coin flips. Occurring prior to the start of the regular season, this event determined that home-ice advantage were granted to champions of the Patrick and Norris divisions, with the Adams and Smythe division champions receiving that advantage for the following season. Similarly, a puck flip determined that home-ice advantage for the Stanley Cup final were granted to the Wales Conference champion this year, with the Campbell Conference champion receiving the advantage next season.

The following teams qualified for the playoffs:

Prince of Wales Conference

Adams Division
 Montreal Canadiens, Adams Division champions – 109 points
 Boston Bruins – 96 points
 Buffalo Sabres – 93 points
 Quebec Nordiques – 82 points

Patrick Division
 New York Islanders, Patrick Division champions, Prince of Wales Conference regular season champions – 118 points
 New York Rangers – 92 points
 Philadelphia Flyers – 87 points
 Pittsburgh Penguins – 75 points

Clarence Campbell Conference

Norris Division
 Minnesota North Stars, Norris Division champions – 94 points
 Winnipeg Jets – 80 points
 St. Louis Blues – 72 points (32 wins)
 Chicago Black Hawks – 72 points (30 wins)

Smythe Division
 Edmonton Oilers, Smythe Division champions, Clarence Campbell Conference regular season champions – 111 points
 Vancouver Canucks – 77 points
 Calgary Flames – 75 points
 Los Angeles Kings – 63 points

Playoff bracket

Division Semifinals

Prince of Wales Conference

(A1) Montreal Canadiens vs. (A4) Quebec Nordiques 

This was the first playoff series meeting between these two teams.

Dale Hunter scored the game-winning overtime goal in the decisive Game 5 twenty-two seconds into the first OT to help the Nordiques eliminate the Canadiens.

(A2) Boston Bruins vs. (A3) Buffalo Sabres 

This was the first playoff series meeting between these two teams.

(P1) New York Islanders vs. (P4) Pittsburgh Penguins 

This was the second playoff series meeting between these two teams. New York won the only previous meeting in seven games in the 1975 Stanley Cup Quarterfinals after falling behind 3–0 in the series.

John Tonelli scored the game-tying goal late in the third period and game-winning overtime goal in the decisive Game 5 to lift the Islanders over the Penguins.

(P2) New York Rangers vs. (P3) Philadelphia Flyers 

This was the fourth playoff series meeting between the two teams. Philadelphia won two of the previous three meetings, including their most recent meeting in the 1980 Stanley Cup Quarterfinals in five games.

Game two saw New York's Mikko Leinonen set an NHL playoff record with six assists, a feat only matched by Wayne Gretzky.

Clarence Campbell Conference

(N1) Minnesota North Stars vs. (N4) Chicago Black Hawks 

This was the first playoff series meeting between these two teams.

(N2) Winnipeg Jets vs. (N3) St. Louis Blues 

This was the first playoff series meeting between these two teams.

(S1) Edmonton Oilers vs. (S4) Los Angeles Kings 

This was the first playoff series meeting between these two teams. Game Three is known as "The Miracle on Manchester" as the Kings scored five goals to force overtime and ultimately winning the game in OT.

(S2) Vancouver Canucks vs. (S3) Calgary Flames 

This was the first playoff series meeting between these two teams.

Division Finals

Prince of Wales Conference

(A2) Boston Bruins vs. (A4) Quebec Nordiques 

This was the first playoff series meeting between these two teams.

(P1) New York Islanders vs. (P2) New York Rangers 

This was fourth playoff series meeting between these two teams. The Islanders won two of the previous three meetings. This was a rematch of last year's Stanley Cup Semifinals, in which the Islanders won in a four-game sweep.

Clarence Campbell Conference

(N3) St. Louis Blues vs. (N4) Chicago Black Hawks 

This was the third playoff series meeting between these two teams. Chicago won both previous meetings, including their most recent meeting in a three-game sweep in the 1980 Preliminary Round.

(S2) Vancouver Canucks vs. (S4) Los Angeles Kings 

This was the first playoff series meeting between these two teams.

Conference Finals

Prince of Wales Conference Final

(P1) New York Islanders vs. (A4) Quebec Nordiques 

This was the first playoff series meeting between these two teams.

Clarence Campbell Conference Final

(N4) Chicago Black Hawks vs. (S2) Vancouver Canucks 

This was the first playoff series meeting between these two teams.

Canucks Coach Roger Neilson was tossed out of game 2 for holding up a white towel on a hockey stick as a form of protest. He was ejected from the game along with two players but the protest began the Canucks Towel Power tradition that still exists to this day and has since been copied by other teams.

Stanley Cup Finals

This was the second playoff meeting between these two teams. New York won the only previous meeting in a two-game sweep in the 1976 Preliminary Round.

In the Stanley Cup Finals, the Cinderella run of the Vancouver Canucks came to an end with a four-game sweep by the Islanders, winning their third consecutive Stanley Cup.

Player statistics

Skaters
These are the top ten skaters based on points.

Goaltenders
This is a combined table of the top five goaltenders based on goals against average and the top five goaltenders based on save percentage, with at least 420 minutes played. The table is sorted by GAA, and the criteria for inclusion are bolded.

See also
1981–82 NHL season
List of NHL seasons
List of Stanley Cup champions

References

 

playoffs
Stanley Cup playoffs